La Gata, is a Mexican telenovela produced by Valentín Pimstein for Teleprogramas Acapulco, SA in 1970. It stars María Rivas and Juan Ferrara. Based on an original story by Inés Rodena and adapted by Estela Calderón.

Cast

References

External links 
 

Mexican telenovelas
Televisa telenovelas
1970 telenovelas
1970 Mexican television series debuts
1970 Mexican television series endings
Mexican television series based on Venezuelan television series
Spanish-language telenovelas